William Rutherford  (20 April 1839, Ancrum Craig, Roxburghshire – 21 February 1899, 14 Douglas Crescent, Edinburgh) was a Scottish physician and physiologist. For 25 years he was professor of physiology at the University of Edinburgh, and contributed to the development of experimental physiology. He was Fullerian Professor of Physiology and Comparative Anatomy from 1872 to 1875.

Life
Rutherford was born at Ancrum Craig Farm near Ancrum in Roxburghshire, the son of Elizabeth (née Bunyan) Thomas Rutherford, a farmer and landowner. He was educated at Jedburgh Grammar School then studied medicine at the University of Edinburgh, gaining his doctorate (MD) in 1863.

After studying in Berlin, Vienna, and Paris, he became assistant to John Hughes Bennett, professor of physiology at the University of Edinburgh. After the Edinburgh anatomist John Goodsir told Rutherford about the new experimental physiology in Germany, William Rutherford and the ophthalmologist Douglas Argyll Robertson  became the first in the United Kingdom to introduce the new experimental apparatus of Hermann von Helmholtz, Emil du Bois-Reymond and Carl Ludwig.

In 1869 he was elected a fellow of the Royal Society of Edinburgh, his proposer being John Hughes Bennett.

In 1869 Rutherford became assistant professor of physiology at King's College, London. In 1871 he was appointed professor of physiology at the Royal Institution. In 1874 he returned to the University of Edinburgh to succeed Bennett as professor of physiology. In 1878 he was elected a member of the Aesculapian Club.

Rutherford lectured at the University of Edinburgh when Arthur Conan Doyle studied medicine there. Like his fictional character Sherlock Holmes, who was based on a real person, Conan Doyle's Professor Challenger was based in part on Rutherford. From 1881 his laboratory assistant was Sutherland Simpson.

He died 21 February 1899 at 14 Douglas Crescent, Edinburgh. He was not married and had no children, so he was buried with his parents in Ancrum parish churchyard.

His chair at the University was filled by Prof Edward Albert Sharpey-Schafer.

Works
 On the morbid appearances met with in the brains of thirty insane persons, 1869
 Influence of the vagus upon the vascular system, 1869
 Introductory lecture to the course of physiology in Kings College, London, 1869, 1869
 An introduction to the study of medicine : a lecture delivered at the opening of the medical session of 1871–72, in King's College, London, 1871
 The present aspects of physiology; an introductory lecture, 1874
 Outlines of practical histology : being the notes of the Histological Section of the Class of Practical Physiology held in the University of Edinburgh, 1875
 The sense of hearing: a lecture, 1886
 Syllabus of lectures on physiology, 1887
 A General account of histological methods, 1887
 On the conditions that influence the attainment of the physiological ideal : introductory lecture, 14 October 1890, 1890
 The tercentenary of the compound microscope; an inaugural address delivered 7 November 1890, to the Scottish Microscopical Society, 1891
 On the method of studying a natural science such as physiology : an introductory lecture, delivered 9 October 1894, 1894

Notes

References

External links
 Notes and Laboratory records of Professor William Rutherford (1839–1899), and Notes from Lectures given by Rutherford and taken down by others, held at the Edinburgh University Library, Special Collections Division

 

1839 births
1899 deaths
19th-century Scottish medical doctors
People from the Scottish Borders
Scottish physiologists
Alumni of the University of Edinburgh
Academics of the University of Edinburgh
Academics of King's College London
Fullerian Professors of Physiology
Fellows of the Royal Society of Edinburgh
Fellows of the Royal Society
Fellows of the Royal College of Physicians of Edinburgh